The Tulane Medical Center is a hospital located in New Orleans, Louisiana.  The Tulane Medical Center has centers covering nearly all major specialties of medicine, and is the primary teaching hospital for the Tulane University School of Medicine.  The hospital is jointly owned by Hospital Corporation of America (HCA) (82.5%) and Tulane University (17.5%). Tulane University and LCMC announced on October 10, 2022, that LCMC would purchase Tulane Medical Center (along with Lakeview Regional Medical Center, and Tulane Lakeside Hospital) from HCA for $150 Million.

Centers
The Tulane Medical Center encompasses the Tulane University Hospital and Clinic, Tulane–Lakeside Hospital, Tulane Hospital for Children, Tulane Cancer Center, Tulane Abdominal Transplant at Tulane Medical Center, Tulane-Lakeside Women's Center, Tulane Multispecialty Center Metairie, Tulane Multispecialty Center uptown, Tulane Multispecialty Center Downtown, and the Tulane Institute for Sports Medicine. In 2017, Lakeview Regional Medical Center in Covington became a campus of Tulane Medical Center.

History
The location of the Tulane Medical School was once the New Orleans Chinatown.  The medical center traces its history to 1834, when the medical school now known as the Tulane University School of Medicine opened.  The current hospital opened in 1976 as the Tulane University Hospital and Clinic, and was subsequently purchased by HCA in 1995.  The Lakeside Hospital for Women merged with Tulane University Hospital and Clinic in 2005, and changed its name to Tulane-Lakeside Hospital. 

Tulane University and LCMC announced on October 10, 2022 that LCMC would purchase Tulane Medical Center (along with Lakeview Regional Medical Center, and Tulane Lakeside Hospital) from HCA for $150 Million.  LCMC plans to shift the majority of services provided at Tulane Medical Center to East Jefferson General Hospital and University Medical Center New Orleans over the next 12-24 months.

References

External links
Tulane Medical Center

Teaching hospitals in Louisiana
Hospitals in Louisiana
Hospital buildings completed in 1976
Healthcare in New Orleans
Medical Center
HCA Healthcare
Buildings and structures in New Orleans
1976 establishments in Louisiana
Hospitals established in 1976